This article provides a timeline of elections in Australia, including all the colonial, state, territorial and federal elections. The information starts from when each state or territory held its first election, and continues through to the present day.

About the tables
The background colour indicates which party won the election.
All six states and both territories have established limits on the length of a parliamentary term, with the federal parliament limited to three years, and all state and territorial parliaments limited to a four-year term. In addition the federal government have changed to fixed election dates every three years, and both territories and all states except Tasmania have changed to fixed election dates every four years. For these legislatures, the box is shown as running until the next scheduled election, but one could still be earlier if the government falls due to a motion of no confidence.

1851–1900

1901–1973

1974–present

See also
List of Australian federal elections
List of New South Wales state elections
List of Northern Territory general elections
List of elections in South Australia
List of elections in Victoria
List of Western Australian Legislative Assembly elections

References 

Lists of elections in Australia
Political timelines